Aust Agder Blad is a Norwegian newspaper, published in Risør, Norway, and owned by A-pressen. The paper was launched in 1854. As of 2010 the editor-in-chief was Rolf Røisland. In June 1940, during the occupation of Norway by Nazi Germany, Aust Agder Blad published secret directives which the press had received from the occupants, after which episode the newspaper was stopped and its editor Knut Holm was imprisoned for the rest of the war.

References

External links
 Official website

1854 establishments in Norway
Amedia
Newspapers published in Norway
Norwegian-language newspapers
Newspapers established in 1854
Risør